This is a list of Victory ships. Victory ships were a type of cargo ship which were mass-produced in the United States during World War II.

List 
In the following list, Keel refers to the date of the keel laying, Launch to the launch date, and Delivery to the ship's completion date. 

The MC Hull No. is a unique number assigned by the United States Maritime Commission (MC for Maritime Commission). 

Gaps in the hull numbers correspond to ships whose contracts were cancelled.

References 

World War II merchant ships of the United States
Lists of World War II ships
 
Boulder Victory-class cargo ships
World War II auxiliary ships of the United States